UFS may refer to:

Computers
Universal Flash Storage
Unix File System
Unsupervised Forward Selection, a data reduction algorithm

Other
 UFS (trade union), former trade union in the United Kingdom
 United Family Services
 United Feature Syndicate, commonly known as United Media 
 United Feeder Service, a company formerly part of the United Express carrier network
 Universal Fighting System, a collectible card game
 Universal Frame System, A bolt locking system standard in the construction of aggressive inline skates
 Universidade Federal de Sergipe, a Brazilian public university
 University of the Free State, in South Africa
 UFS the stock ticker for Domtar